A rubber duck or a rubber duckie is a toy shaped like a duck, that is usually yellow with a flat base. It may be made of rubber or rubber-like material such as vinyl plastic. Rubber ducks were invented in the late 1800s when it became possible to more easily shape rubber, and are believed to improve developmental skills in children during water play.

The yellow rubber duck has achieved an iconic status in Western pop culture and is often symbolically linked to bathing. Various novelty variations of the toy are produced, and many organisations use yellow rubber ducks in rubber duck races for fundraising worldwide.

History

The history of the rubber duck is linked to the emergence of rubber manufacturing in the late 19th century. The earliest rubber ducks were made from harder rubber when manufacturers began using Charles Goodyear's invention, vulcanized rubber. Consequently, these solid rubber ducks were not capable of floating and were instead intended as chew toys.

Sculptor Peter Ganine created a sculpture of a duck in the 1940s. He then patented it and reproduced it as a floating toy, of which over 50 million were sold.

Besides the ubiquitous yellow rubber duck with which most people are familiar, there have been numerous novelty variations on the basic theme, including character ducks representing professions, politicians, or celebrities, a concept introduced by Mark Boldt's Rubba Ducks. There are also ducks that glow in the dark, quack, change color, have interior LED illumination, or include a wind-up engine that enables them to "swim". In 2001, The Sun, a British tabloid reported that Queen Elizabeth II had a rubber duck in her bathroom that wore an inflatable crown. The duck was spotted by a workman who was repainting her bathroom. The story prompted sales of rubber ducks in the United Kingdom to increase by 80% for a short period.

Rubber ducks are collected by enthusiasts. The 2011 Guinness World Record for World's Largest Rubber Duck Collection stood at 5,631 different rubber ducks, and was awarded to Charlotte Lee. In 2013, the rubber duck was inducted into the Toy Hall of Fame, a museum in Rochester, New York, along with the game of chess. Toys are selected based on factors like icon-status, longevity, and innovation.

In popular culture 
Ernie, a popular Muppet from the television series Sesame Street, has performed the song "Rubber Duckie" multiple times since the series began. Ernie frequently spoke to his duck and carried it with him in other segments of the show. On a special occasion, Little Richard performed the song.

C. W. McCall's hit song "Convoy" (and the movie and novel it inspired) are narrated from the viewpoint of a character who replaced the bulldog hood ornament on his Mack truck with a bathtub toy and used the on-air handle of "Rubber Duck".

Protest symbol
Rubber ducks have also become a protest symbol simultaneously in Belgrade, Brazil, and Moscow in 2017, and in Bangkok in 2020.

World's largest rubber duck

Since 2007, several ducks of various sizes created by Hofman have been on display in countries and territories such as Amsterdam, Netherlands; Lommel, Belgium; Osaka, Japan; Sydney, Australia; São Paulo, Brazil; Hong Kong, China; Kaohsiung, Taiwan; and Seoul, Korea; until 14 November 2014, and went on display in the United States after 20 October 2013.

In 2013, China's "Great Firewall" blocked searches for "big yellow duck" because Chinese activists were photo-shopping the Rubber Duck sculpture into the Tank Man photo of the Tiananmen Square Massacre. If the term "Big Yellow Duck" were searched, a message appeared stating that according to relevant laws, statutes, and policies, the results of the search could not be shown.

Races

Rubber duck races, also known as derby duck races, have been used as a method of fundraising for organizations worldwide. People donate money to the organization by sponsoring a duck. At the end of the fundraising drive, all of the ducks are dumped into a waterway, with the first to float past the finish line winning a prize for its sponsor.

North America
There are hundreds of races held in the United States and internationally. The largest race in the United States is the annual Freestore Foodbank Rubber Duck Regatta in Cincinnati, Ohio. First run in 1995, the Rubber Duck Regatta now features over 150,000 ducks raced to raise money for the organization. Since its beginning in 1995 the Rubber Duck Regatta in Cincinnati Ohio has raised over $9 million, and over $1 million has been raised for each year's race since 2014.

The annual Aspen Ducky Derby was first run by the Rotary Club of Aspen, Colorado, in 1991. The derby now features 30,000 ducks and takes place each August in Aspen's Rio Grande Park. Through its past 20 years, the Aspen Ducky Derby has raised more than $2.3 million to benefit 65 nonprofit groups.

In Fort Wayne, Indiana, for over 30 years the Weigand Construction Duck Race takes place in the summer at Johnny Appleseed Park to support the organization SCAN, whose mission is to eliminate the abuse and neglect of children in northeast Indiana through family services, education and community partnerships.

One of the more famous rubber duck races is the Great Knoxville Rubber Duck Race. This race received attention when the Tennessee Supreme Court ruled that it was a lottery, which stopped the race for a few years. After the state amended its constitution to allow lotteries with special exceptions, the race was reinstituted. The Derby Duck race sees over 40,000 ducks race to benefit the Boys and Girls Club of Tennessee Valley.

A famous rubber duck race is the Halifax Duck Derby. This race has 10,000 rubber ducks in the Halifax Harbour along Bishops Landing. There is a grand prize of $1 million Canadian dollars; other prizes include a trip to anywhere in Canada, large-screen TVs, and more. This race has been very successful in raising money and awareness for its organizations.

Founded in 1988 to help the town raise funds for a new ice rink, nowadays the Derby races 25,000 rubber ducks down a stretch of the Qu'Appelle River and features a grand prize of CAD$1 million. The town makes a day out of it, with a pancake breakfast, bands and other entertainments, kids' activities, and a "parade to the post."

The Estes Park Rotary Duck Race raises money for sixty-eight different charities.  Contestants must choose which charity to donate their money to when they buy their ticket.

Australia
The Great Brisbane Duck Race is held on the Brisbane River each year to raise funds for the PA Research Foundation. The  race saw 30,000 rubber ducks enter the race in 2011.

One other race was conducted in Australia in January 1988. It was run from the "High-level bridge" to the "Low-level bridge" near Katherine, Northern Territory on the Australia Day long weekend. Acting on behalf of the town's Bicentennial Committee, Royal Australian Air Force officers Andrew Cairns and Jock MacGowan constructed the release cage from PVC pipe, purchased and numbered the ducks, printed tickets, and even arranged a helicopter flypast.

Europe

United Kingdom

In Stockbridge, Edinburgh since 1988, the Stockbridge Community Festival has held the annual Stockbridge Duck Race to raise money for local charities. 1000 rubber ducks are released into the Water of Leith at the Stockbridge to float downstream to the finishing post at the Falshaw Bridge. The 2010 race was memorable for a sudden rain shower at the finish line. The 2011 race was held on 3 July with proceeds going to local charities Stockbridge House & St. Columba's Hospice.

For over 25 years, Bibury in Gloucestershire has hosted an annual Duck Race on Boxing Day. The charity event, which attracts thousands of spectators, is split into two races; one featuring the iconic yellow ducks, the other featuring the more realistic decoy ducks, both held on the River Coln.

On 31 August 2008, the Great British Duck Race was held near Hampton Court Palace in London. The race broke the world record for the number of ducks used together, with a total of 250,000. The ducks used in the race were a bright blue color, after stewards in the previous year faced problems from spectators throwing their own ducks into the water.

Each year, on Easter Monday, a duck race is organised in Glenridding by the local mountain rescue team to raise funds. Another is the Manchester Duck Race, held at Spinningfields on the River Irwell each Good Friday, with several thousand ducks.

Germany

Every July a charity race called "Entencup" is held in Nuremberg. The beneficiary changes each time, among them the Nuremberg Zoo.

Scientific studies

Oceanography

During a Pacific storm on 10 January 1992, three 40-foot containers holding 28,800 Friendly Floatees plastic bathtub toys from a Chinese factory were washed off a ship, containing 7,200 each of blue turtles, yellow ducks, red beavers, and green frogs. Two-thirds of the toys floated south and landed three months later on the shores of Indonesia, Australia, and South America. The remaining 10,000 toys headed north to Alaska and then completed a full circle back near Japan, caught up in the North Pacific Gyre current as the so-called Great Pacific Garbage Patch. Many of the toys then entered the Bering Strait between Alaska and Russia and were trapped in the Arctic ice. They moved through the ice at a rate of one mile per day, and in 2000 they were sighted in the North Atlantic. The movement of the toys had been monitored by American oceanographer Curtis Ebbesmeyer. Bleached by sun and seawater, the ducks and beavers had faded to white, but the turtles and frogs had kept their original colors.

Between July and December 2003, The First Years Inc. offered a $100 US savings bond reward to anybody who recovered a Floatee in New England, Canada or Iceland. More of the toys were recovered in 2004 than in any of the preceding three years. However, still more of these toys were predicted to have headed eastward past Greenland and make landfall on the southwestern shores of the United Kingdom in 2007.

These  toys were the subject of Donovan Hohn's 2011 book Moby-Duck: The True Story of 28,800 Bath Toys Lost at Sea.

Glacial melting

In August 2008, NASA'S Jet Propulsion Laboratory undertook studies of Greenland's Jakobshavn Glacier to determine how interior glacial meltflow during the summer influenced its movement. A sophisticated football-sized probe that had a GPS device, pressure sensor, thermometer and accelerometer was lowered by rope into one of the glacier's moulins. The probe's equipment was designed to find structures such as waterfalls inside the ice. Unfortunately the probe went silent, so ninety rubber ducks marked in English, Danish, and Inuit with the text "science experiment" and "reward", along with an email address to contact if found, were also put into the moulins and it was hoped that the ducks would eventually exit and be found by hunters or fishermen around Baffin Bay. As of 2012, none of the ducks were found or returned, possibly due to being trapped in large aquifers later discovered inside the ice.

Germ study

A 2019 article in the scientific journal Environmental Science: Water Research & Technology details how rubber ducks were used to expand knowledge on how potable water interacts with flexible plastic materials in relation to microbial and nutrient contamination. Particularly how these microbes could affect potentially vulnerable end users. The bathroom, despite being the place for the family to bathe and become clean, is surprisingly good at creating the perfect conditions for microbial growth and so the researchers wished to see if these soft plastic toys could potentially pose a risk. They determined that, although some bacteria and microbes can be absorbed into the toys, only under specific laboratory conditions did they become dangerous to human beings and so are largely safe.

See also

 Hook-a-duck
 Rubber duck debugging

References

Bathing
Charity fundraisers
Fictional ducks
Rubber toys
Duck
Traditional toys
Water toys
Ducks in popular culture